Carlos Andrés Becerra Alarcón (born 5 August 1982 in Bogotá) is a Colombian road cyclist.

Major results
2007
2nd Overall Clásico Ciclístico Banfoandes
2009
1st Stage 9 Vuelta al Táchira
2011
2nd Overall Vuelta al Táchira
2015
2nd Overall Clásico RCN
2016
1st Stage 10 Vuelta Ciclista a Costa Rica

References

1982 births
Living people
Colombian male cyclists
Sportspeople from Bogotá
21st-century Colombian people